Peter R. Pouncey (born October 1, 1937) is an English author, classicist, and former president of Amherst College.

Biography
The son of a British father and a French-British mother, he was born in Tsingtao (now Qingdao), China.
At the end of World War II, after several dislocations and separations, his family reassembled in England. Pouncey was educated there in boarding schools and at Oxford. For a time, he studied for the Jesuit priesthood but ultimately experienced a loss of faith.

Shortly after obtaining a Ph.D. from Columbia University in 1969, he was appointed assistant professor of Greek and Latin in the Classics Department.  In 1972, he became Dean of Columbia College.  As Dean, he was a forceful advocate of coeducation, going so far as to hold a faculty vote without the knowledge of the university's president, William McGill.  McGill rejected the proposal, due to concerns about the future of Barnard College. In 1976, Pouncey resigned as Dean.  As a member of the Classics Department, he produced a number of notable works of scholarship, including the book The Necessities of War: A Study of Thucydides' Pessimism, which won the university's Lionel Trilling Award.

In 1984, he became President of Amherst College.  Upon his retirement in 1994, he returned to Columbia.  His novel Rules for Old Men Waiting won the McKitterick Prize and was nominated for the Commonwealth Writers Prize in 2006.

For many years, Pouncey divided his time between New York City and northern Connecticut.

Personal life
Pouncey has two biological children and one step-child. He has been married and divorced three times. His second wife, Susan Rieger, author of The Divorce Papers and The Heirs, is a former administrator at Yale and Columbia Universities. Their daughter, Maggie Pouncey, is the author of the novel Perfect Reader. His third wife, Katherine Dalsimer, is a Clinical Professor of Psychology at Weill Medical College of Cornell University, and an author.

Works
The Necessities of War: A Study of Thucydides' Pessimism, Columbia University Press, (1980) 
Rules for Old Men Waiting (2005)

Further reading
Ward, John William. 1969 Red, White, and Blue: Men, Books, and Ideas in American Culture . New York: Oxford University Press

Notes

 

1937 births
Living people
Columbia University faculty
British writers
Presidents of Amherst College
Columbia University alumni
Alumni of the University of Oxford